William Deacon may refer to:
 William Deacon (politician) (1872–1943), member of the Queensland Legislative Assembly
 William Deacon (cricketer) (1828–1903), English cricketer and banker
 William Arthur Deacon (1890–1977), Canadian literary critic and editor
 William Frederick Deacon (1799–1845), English author and journalist
 Bill Deacon (1944–2019), New Zealand rugby league player